Ahmed Zaki  (born 4 February  1999) is an Egyptian professional footballer who plays as a defender for Egyptian Premier League club Zamalek.

References

Egyptian footballers
Living people
1999 births
Zamalek SC players